Swingin' on a Rainbow is a 1945 American film directed by William Beaudine and starring Jane Frazee. It includes the final film appearance of Harry Langdon.

Plot
At a radio station run by Thomas Marsden, a songwriter, Jimmy Rhodes, skips town without fulfilling a contractual obligation, so amateur songstress Lynn Bird is hired to replace him, Marsden mistakenly believing her to be Rhodes's partner.

Bird composes and writes a few songs, with help from Marsden's assistant, Chester Willoughby, and her success helps save the station.

Cast
 Jane Frazee as Lynn Bird
 Paul Harvey as Marsden
 Richard Davies as Jimmy Rhodes
 Minna Gombell as Minnie
 Harry Langdon as Willoughby
 Amelita Ward as Barbara
 Helen Talbot as Myrtle

External links
 

1945 films
1940s English-language films
American black-and-white films
1945 musical films
Republic Pictures films
Films directed by William Beaudine
American musical films
1940s American films